Las secretas intenciones, is a Mexican telenovela produced by Lucy Orozco for Televisa in 1992. Starring by Cristián Castro and Yolanda Andrade with Helena Rojo, Silvia Pasquel and David Ostrosky as the main antagonists.

Cast 
Cristián Castro as Miguel Ángel Curiel
Yolanda Andrade as Larissa Cardenal
Helena Rojo as Antonieta Alcántara 
Silvia Pasquel as Olivia Cardenal
Enrique Rocha as Doctor Daniel Baguer
Blanca Sánchez as Carolina Curiel
Orlando Carrió as Carlos Cardenal
Claudio Brook as Óscar Arteaga
Juan Carlos Colombo as José Manuel Curiel 
Laura Almela as Georgina Alcántara 
Alejandra Procuna as Clara Cardenal 
Rodolfo Árias as Salvador "Chava"
Felipe Casillas as Néstor 
Juan Ángel Esparza as Guillermo
Andrés García Jr. as Arturo
David Ostrosky as  Dr. Gilberto Fuentes
Mariagna Prats as Esperanza
Ninón Sevilla as Julieta
Anna Ciocchetti as Diana 
Verónica Langer as Paty
Alberto Estrella

Transmission 
From Monday May 10, 1993 through Friday August 6th, 1993 Univision showed 'Las secretas intenciones' weekday afternoons  replacing La traidora with Clarisa replacing it the following day.

From Monday August 12, 2002 through Friday November 1st, 2002 TLNovelas showed 'Las secretas intenciones' weekdays replacing Lazos de Amor with Imperio de cristal replacing it the following day.

References

External links 

1992 telenovelas
1992 Mexican television series debuts
1992 Mexican television series endings
Mexican telenovelas
Televisa telenovelas
Spanish-language telenovelas